Count of Harmel is a title of nobility of the Kingdom of Belgium. The title was created by King Baudouin for Pierre Harmel, who was a well-known Belgian lawyer, politician and diplomat, and served for eight months as Prime Minister of Belgium. As Foreign Minister, he created NATO's so-called "Harmel Doctrine" that advocated a strong defense combined with good diplomatic relations with the countries of the Warsaw Pact. King Baudouin made Harmel a Count in 1991. The title is hereditary and descends to the senior male by agnatic primogeniture.

Counts Harmel (1991)
 Pierre Charles José Marie Harmel, 1st Count Harmel (1911 – 2009)
 Roger Harmel, 2nd Count Harmel (born 1948) 

Counts of Belgium
Noble titles created in 1991
1991 establishments in Belgium